Beylerbeyi S.K. is a Turkish football club in Istanbul. The team plays at the 6,500 capacity Beylerbeyi 75. Yıl Stadium, sharing the ground with Anadolu Üsküdar. Beylerbeyi S.K. was the  recruitment resource of Galatasaray Sports Club between 2003 and 2009.

League participations
 TFF First League: 1963-69, 1981–83, 1996–98
 TFF Second League: 1969-72, 1984–96, 1998-01, 2008-09
 TFF Third League: 2001-08, 2009-
 Turkish Regional Amateur League: 1972-81, 1983–84

Current squad

External links
Beylerbeyi SK Official Web Site

See also
List of Turkish Sports Clubs by Foundation Dates

 
Association football clubs established in 1903
Beylerbeyi SK
1903 establishments in the Ottoman Empire